All Fall Down may refer to:

 "... all fall down", a phrase from the nursery rhyme "Ring a Ring o' Roses" which first appeared in print in 1881

Film and television 
 All Fall Down (1962 film), a film directed by John Frankenheimer, based on a novel by James Leo Herlihy (see below)
 All Fall Down (Sapphire & Steel), a 2005 audio drama based on the TV series Sapphire & Steel

Television episodes 
 "All Fall Down" (Australian Playhouse), 1967
 "All Fall Down" (The Big Comfy Couch), 1994
 "All Fall Down" (The Bill), 2000
 "All Fall Down" (The Colbys), 1987
 "All Fall Down" (CSI: Miami), 2010
 "All Fall Down" (Danger Mouse), 1986
 "All Fall Down" (Miami Medical), 2010
 "All Fall Down" (The Mothers-in-Law), 1967
 "All Fall Down" (Past Life), 2010
 "All Fall Down" (Voyagers!), 1983
 "All Fall Down", an episode of Code Name: Eternity
 "All Fall Down", an episode of Peep and the Big Wide World, 2004

Literature

Comics 
 All Fall Down (comics), a 2011 six-issue comic book by Casey Jones
 "All Fall Down", a 1990 issue of the Matrix Quest series of Transformers comics

Nonfiction 
 All Fall Down, The Brandon deWilde Story, a 2012 biography by Patrisha McLean
 All Fall Down: America's Tragic Encounter With Iran, a 1985 book by Gary Sick

Novels 
 All Fall Down (Carter novel), by Ally Carter, 2015
 All Fall Down (Herlihy novel), by James Leo Herlihy, 1960
 All Fall Down, by Megan Hart, 2012
 All Fall Down, by Jean Little
 All Fall Down, by Sally Nicholls, 2012
 All Fall Down, by Leonard Strong, 1944
 All Fall Down, by Jennifer Weiner, 2014

Other 
 All Fall Down, a 1963 poetry collection by Alan Jackson
 All Fall Down, a 1994 play by Wendy Lill
 All Fall Down, a 2009 story collection by Mary Caponegro

Music

Albums 
 All Fall Down (The 77s album), 1984
 All Fall Down (Against All Authority album) or the title song, 1998
 All Fall Down (The Sound album) or the title song, 1982
 All Fall Down (Shawn Colvin album) or the title song, 2012
 All Fall Down, by Jim Fox
 All Fall Down, by Susan Herndon, 2010
 All Fall Down, an EP by the King Blues, 2004

Songs 
 "All Fall Down" (Camo & Krooked song), 2011
 "All Fall Down" (Five Star song), 1985
 "All Fall Down" (Ultravox song), 1986
 "All Fall Down", by Anastacia from Heavy Rotation, 2008
 "All Fall Down", by Bic Runga, a B-side of the single "Suddenly Strange", 1997
 "All Fall Down", by Billy Bragg from Volume 2, 2006
 "All Fall Down", by Gary Hughes from The Reissues, 2000
 "All Fall Down", by George Jones, with Emmylou Harris, from Friends in High Places, 1991
 "All Fall Down", by Good Riddance from For God and Country, 1995
 "All Fall Down", by Heiruspecs from Small Steps, 2002
 "All Fall Down", by Kaz James from If They Knew, 2008
 "All Fall Down", by Kevin Gilbert from Thud, 1995
 "All Fall Down", by Lindisfarne from Dingly Dell, 1972
 "All Fall Down", by MercyMe from Almost There, 2001
 "All Fall Down", by Midget, 1998
 "All Fall Down", by Missing Persons from Rhyme & Reason, 1984
 "All Fall Down", by OneRepublic from Dreaming Out Loud, 2007
 "All Fall Down", by Platinum Blonde from Platinum Blonde, 1983
 "All Fall Down", by Primal Scream, 1985
 "All Fall Down", by Richard Clapton, 1993
 "All Fall Down", by Russell Dickerson from Yours, 2017
 "All Fall Down", by Sarah Masen from Sarah Masen, 1996
 "All Fall Down", by Shawn Mullins from 9th Ward Pickin Parlor, 2006
 "All Fall Down", by TZU from Computer Love, 2008
 "All Fall Down", by William Finn from the musical revue Infinite Joy'', 2000

See also 
 All Falls Down (disambiguation)
 We All Fall Down (disambiguation)